Danesh Rural District is in the Central District of Qods County, Tehran province, Iran. At the National Census of 2006, its population was 4,799 in 1,225 households, when it was in the former Qods District of Shahriar County. There were 4,357 inhabitants in 1,278 households at the following census of 2011, by which time the district had been separated from the county and Qods County established. At the most recent census of 2016, the population of the rural district was 3,889 in 1,198 households. The largest of its six villages was Shahrak-e Danesh, with 3,402 people.

References 

Qods County

Rural Districts of Tehran Province

Populated places in Tehran Province

Populated places in Qods County